Heidi Lee Morgan (born June 29, 1967) is a retired American professional wrestler who competed in the World Wrestling Federation, International World Class Championship Wrestling, Ladies Pro Wrestling Association, and National Wrestling Federation. She was also a member of the wrestling stable Team America.

Career
Morgan began her career at the age of ten, under the name Daisy Mae, as the valet for her father Les Morgan. Several years later, Morgan pursued a career as a bodybuilder and was approached at an exhibition by Vince McMahon about a wrestling career. After deciding to join the family business, she was trained by The Fabulous Moolah, Johnny Rodz and Wolfgang Von Heller. After working on the independent circuit in North and South Carolina, she joined the National Wrestling Federation. As part of the Federation, Morgan feuded with Wendi Richter. She battled Richter, the NWF Women's Champion, in a first ever women's steel cage match in May 1987.

Morgan later held the LPWA Tag Team Championship with Misty Blue Simmes and the WWWA Ladies Championship during her career.

After giving birth to her daughter, Morgan wanted to revive her wrestling career in 1997, but she broke her back in her first match back in the ring. She attempted an aerial maneuver, but she and her opponent lost their balance, which resulted in the break.

Personal life
Morgan married a man named Archie and had a daughter named Adrianna.

Her family owns a professional wrestling school called Ringmasters Wrestling School.

Championships and accomplishments
Ladies Professional Wrestling Association
LPWA Tag Team Championship (1 time) - with Misty Blue Simmes
International World Class Championship Wrestling
IWCCW Women's Championship (1 time)
Virginia Wrestling Association
VWA Women's Championship (2 times)
World Wide Wrestling Alliance
WWWA Woman's Championship (2 times, first)

References

External links
Heidi Lee Morgan in LPWA
Profile at Online World of Wrestling

1967 births
American female professional wrestlers
Living people
Sportspeople from St. Louis
Professional wrestling managers and valets
21st-century American women
20th-century professional wrestlers